Controlled Folly is the debut studio album by Scott Cain, winner of the third and final series of Popstars Australia in 2002. The album was released in September 2002 and debuted and peaked at number 49 on the ARIA Charts.

Track listing
"I'm Moving On"  – 3:32
"Feeling So Right"  – 3:58
"Perfect Day"  – 3:59
"The Right Time"  – 3:55
"Crazy People Rock"  – 3:22
"Gotta Get You Back"  – 3:57
"Can't Deny It"  – 3:39
"Give It to Me Baby"  – 3:48
"Coming Up for Air"  – 3:37
"Sunshine Superman"  – 3:34
"Get Back in the Groove"  – 3:31
"On the Dancefloor" (bonus track) – 3:23

Charts

References

2002 debut albums
Warner Music Australia albums
Pop albums by Australian artists
Scott Cain albums